Nathaniel Richardson (February/April 2, 1754 – September 2, 1827) was an American silversmith, active in Philadelphia.

Richardson was born to noted silversmith Joseph Richardson Sr. and raised in the craft. From 1785-1791 he partnered with his older brother, Joseph Richardson Jr., in the silversmithing firm of Joseph & Nathaniel Richardson, but then gave up silversmithing and became an ironmonger and hardware merchant with Isaac Paxton. His silver, created in partnership with his brother, is collected in the Addison Gallery of American Art, Museum of Fine Arts, Boston, Art Institute of Chicago, Clark Art Institute, Philadelphia Museum of Art, Winterthur Museum, and Yale University Art Gallery.

References 
 Joseph Richardson and family, Philadelphia silversmiths, Martha Gandy Fales, Historical Society of Pennsylvania, 1974.
 "Nathaniel Richardson", American Silversmiths.
 Richardson Family Papers, Winterthur Museum.
 American Silversmiths and Their Marks: The Definitive (1948) Edition, Stephen G. C. Ensko, Courier Corporation, 2012, page 113.

American silversmiths
1754 births
1827 deaths